HD 34266, also known as HR 1721 is a solitary, yellow hued star located in the southern constellation Columba, the dove. It has an apparent magnitude of 5.73, making it faintly visible to the naked eye under ideal conditions. Based on Gaia DR3 parallax measurements, the object is located 539 light years away.

This is an evolved giant star that is currently on the red giant branch, fusing hydrogen in a shell around an inert helium core. It has a stellar classification of G8 III. HD 34266 is calculated to be 490 million years old, almost 10 times younger than the Sun.

References

Columba (constellation)
034266
24426
1721
G-type giants
Red giants
Columbae, 6
Durchmusterung objects